Sangobeg is a remote coastal crofting township which overlooks Sangobeg Sands in Sutherland, Scottish Highlands in the Scottish council area of Highland.

References

Populated places in Sutherland
Sangobeg